The men's pole vault event at the 1968 European Indoor Games was held on 10 March in Madrid.

Results

References

Pole vault at the European Athletics Indoor Championships
Pole